Saturnino Grech Pomares (6 June 1914 – 31 July 2007) was a Spanish retired footballer and manager.

Coaching career
He coached Las Palmas, Sevilla, Hércules, Mallorca, Atlético Baleares, Tenerife, Racing de Ferrol, and Compostela.

References

External links
 
 

1914 births
2001 deaths
Footballers from Alicante
Spanish footballers
Association football defenders
Segunda División players
Tercera División players
CE Sabadell FC footballers
RCD Mallorca players
Spanish football managers
La Liga managers
Segunda División managers
Sevilla FC managers
UD Las Palmas managers
CD Tenerife managers
Hércules CF managers
RCD Mallorca managers
UE Lleida managers
SD Compostela managers
Racing de Ferrol managers
CD Atlético Baleares managers